Khoshknudhan-e Pain (also Romanized as Khoshknūdhān-e Pā’īn and Khoshk Now Dehān-e Pā’īn; also known as Arbākaleh, Gushkudagane, Khoshk Nowdahān, Khoshknowdehān, and Khoshk Nowdehān) is a village in Lulaman Rural District, in the Central District of Fuman County, Gilan Province, Iran. At the 2006 census, its population was 1,243, in 327 families.

References 

Populated places in Fuman County